The Mercedes-Benz M282 is a  inline-four 16-valve turbocharged petrol engine produced from 2018. It was jointly developed by the Renault–Nissan–Mitsubishi Alliance and the Mercedes-Benz Group, and is the successor to the 1.6L variant of the M270 engine. The M282 has been sold as the H5Ht by Renault, and as the HR13DDT by Nissan.

Design 
The M282 was developed with Renault as part of Daimler's collaboration with the Renault–Nissan–Mitsubishi Alliance. The M282 shares the same design with the Renault H5Ht engine, with a DOHC and direct injection. The M282 is also the first Mercedes inline-four engine to feature cylinder deactivation (on the second and third cylinders), as well as an engine particulate filter. It is produced by MDC Power GmbH at the Kölleda plant in Thuringia, Germany.

Models

M282 DE14 (80 kW version) 
 2018–present W177 A160
 2019–present W247 B160

M282 DE14 (100 kW version) 
 2018–present W177 A180
 2019–present W177 A220e
 2019–present W247 B180
 2019–present C118 CLA 180

M282 DE14 LA (120kw)
 2018–present W177 A200
 2019–present W177 A250e
 2019–present W247 B200
 2019–present W247 B250e
 2019–present C118 CLA 200
 2019–present X247 GLB 200
 2020–present H247 GLA 200 (Include FFV Engine in Thailand)
 2020–present C118 CLA 250e
 2022-present Renault Duster Oroch

References 

Mercedes-Benz engines
Straight-four engines
Gasoline engines by model